El Hadji Ba (born 5 March 1993) is a professional footballer who plays as a midfielder for Cypriot club Apollon Limassol. Born in France, he plays for the Mauritania national team.

Career
Ba made his professional debut on 24 February 2012 in a league match against Guingamp appearing as a substitute.  Prior to making his debut with Le Havre, he was linked with a move to English club Tottenham Hotspur and reportedly had agreed to join the club.

He made his debut for Sunderland against Carlisle United in the FA Cup on 5 January 2014, and went on to score the third goal in a 3–1 victory.

On 29 June 2015, Ba joined Charlton Athletic on a three-year deal, therefore ending his two-year spell with Sunderland. His contract with the club was terminated on 1 February 2017.

On 6 March 2017, Ba joined the Norwegian team Stabæk.

On 23 June 2022, Ba agreed to join Apollon Limassol in Cyprus.

International career
Born in France, Ba's parents hail from Senegal and Mauritania. He was a French youth international, having represented his nation at under-18 level.

In 2022, he received his first invitation to represent Mauritania. He debuted with Mauritania in a 3–0 2023 Africa Cup of Nations qualification win over Sudan on 4 June 2022.

Career statistics

References

External links
 
 
 
 El Hadji Ba at Le Havre AC 
 

1993 births
Living people
Footballers from Paris
Citizens of Mauritania through descent
Mauritanian footballers
Mauritania international footballers
French footballers
France youth international footballers
Mauritanian people of Senegalese descent
French sportspeople of Mauritanian descent
French sportspeople of Senegalese descent
Association football midfielders
Le Havre AC players
Sunderland A.F.C. players
SC Bastia players
Charlton Athletic F.C. players
Stabæk Fotball players
FC Sochaux-Montbéliard players
RC Lens players
En Avant Guingamp players
Apollon Limassol FC players
Ligue 1 players
Ligue 2 players
Premier League players
Eliteserien players
Mauritanian expatriate footballers
Expatriate footballers in England
Expatriate footballers in Norway
Expatriate footballers in Cyprus
Mauritanian expatriate sportspeople in England
Mauritanian expatriate sportspeople in Norway
Mauritanian expatriate sportspeople in Cyprus
French expatriate sportspeople in England
French expatriate sportspeople in Norway
French expatriate sportspeople in Cyprus